"The Brown Paper Bag Test" is a term in African-American oral history used to describe a colorist discriminatory practice within the African-American community in the 20th century, in which an individual's skin tone is compared to the color of a brown paper bag. The test was allegedly used to determine what privileges an individual could have; only those with a skin color that matched or was lighter than a brown paper bag were allowed admission or membership privileges. The test was believed by many to be used in the 20th century by many African-American social institutions such as sororities, fraternities, social clubs, and churches.

The term is also used in reference to larger issues of class and social stratification and colorism within the African-American population. People were barred from having access to several public spaces and resources because of their darker complexion.
The test was used at the entrance to social functions wherein a brown paper bag was stuck at the door and anyone who was darker than the bag was denied entry.

Color discrimination

Privilege has long been associated with skin tone in the African-American community, dating back to the era of slavery. Mixed-race children of white fathers were sometimes given privileges ranging from more desirable work, apprenticeships or formal education, to allocation of property or even freedom from enslavement. African Americans "contributed to colorism because they have benefited from the privilege of having a skin color closer to that of whites and have embraced the notion that privilege comes with having light skin in America". Lighter-skinned people were afforded certain social and economic advantages over darker-skinned people, even while suffering discrimination. According to Gordon, "light-skinned blacks formed exclusive clubs" after slavery was abolished in the United States. Some clubs were called "Blue Vein Societies", suggesting that if an individual's skin was light enough to show the blue cast of veins, they had more European ancestry (and, therefore, higher social standing). Such discrimination was resented by African Americans with darker complexions. According to Henry Louis Gates Jr., in his book The Future of the Race (1996), the practice of the brown paper bag test may have originated in New Orleans, Louisiana, where there was a substantial third class of free people of color dating from the French colonial era. The test was related to ideas of beauty, in which some people believed that lighter skin and more European features, in general, were more attractive.

From 1900 until about 1950, "paper bag parties" are said to have taken place in neighborhoods of major American cities with a high concentration of African Americans. Many churches, fraternities, and nightclubs used the "brown paper bag" principle as a test for entrance. People at these organizations would take a brown paper bag and hold it against a person's skin. If a person was lighter than the bag, they were admitted.

There is, too, a curious color dynamic that persists in our culture. In fact, New Orleans invented the brown paper bag party — usually at a gathering in a home — where anyone darker than the bag attached to the door was denied entrance. The brown bag criterion survives as a metaphor for how the black cultural elite quite literally establishes caste along color lines within black life. On my many trips to New Orleans, whether to lecture at one of its universities or colleges, to preach from one of its pulpits, or to speak at an empowerment seminar during the annual Essence Music Festival, I have observed color politics at work among black folk. The cruel color code has to be defeated by our love for one another. —Michael Eric Dyson, excerpt from Come Hell or High Water.

The Brown Paper Bag Test was heavily documented and normalized with historically black fraternities and sororities (especially among sororities) and some historically black social clubs founded before 1960, whose members selected others who resembled themselves, generally those reflecting partial European ancestry. Some privileged multi-racial people of color who came from families freed before the American Civil War attempted to distinguish themselves from the mass of freedmen after the war, who appeared to be mostly of African descent and from less privileged families.  New York City's infamous Cotton Club required black female entertainers to pass the Brown Paper Bag Test to be hired and perform for its mostly wealthy white male clientele.

It is rumored a few private historically black colleges and universities (HBCUs) used color tests as a way to critique candidates for admission. For instance, Audrey Elisa Kerr refers to private colleges such as Howard and Spelman requiring applicants to send personal photos.  However, archive pictures of private HBCUs that formerly required personal photos for admission have dark-skinned black students and faculty easily found in respectable numbers.

Colorism through the centuries

The offspring of African men and white women were often born into freedom because of their mothers' legal status of slave vs. free, regardless of color. A law established in Virginia and other colonies in the 17th century dictated that the legal status of these children would be determined by that of their mothers, rather than by their fathers, in opposition to the established precedent of common law. These free descendants became well-established, with descendants moving to frontier regions of Virginia, North Carolina and west as areas opened up. Some prominent Americans were descendants of these early free families, for instance, Ralph Bunche, who served as ambassador to the United Nations.

As early as the 18th century, travelers remarked on the variety of color and features seen in slaves in Virginia, as European ancestry was obvious. Light-skinned slaves, some of whom were descendants of masters and their sons, were sometimes given domestic jobs inside the  master's house, including as companions or maids to his legal children. Some of them were educated, or at least allowed to learn to read. Occasionally the master may have arranged for an apprenticeship for a mixed-race son and freed him upon its completion, especially in the first two decades after the American Revolution, when numerous slaves were freed in the Upper South. In this region, from the Revolution to 1810, the percentage of people of color who were free increased from 1 to more than 10 percent. By 1810, 75% of blacks in Delaware were free.

Newly imported Africans and African Americans with less visible European ancestry were used in hard field labor, and abuse was more frequent in the fields. As tensions concerning slave uprisings rose in the 19th century, slave states imposed more restrictions, including prohibitions on educating slaves and on slaves' movements.  These slaves could be punished for trying to learn to read and write.

In Louisiana especially, Creoles of color had long comprised a third class during the years of slavery. They had achieved a high level of literacy and sophistication under the French and Spanish rule, becoming educated, taking the names of white fathers or lovers, and often receiving property from the white men involved with their families. Many became artisans, property owners, and sometimes slaveholders themselves. Unlike in the Upper South, where free African Americans varied widely in appearance, free people of color in New Orleans and the Deep South tended to be light-skinned due to generations of intermarriage with people of European ancestry. After the United States negotiated the Louisiana Purchase, more Americans settled in New Orleans, bringing with them their binary approach to society, in which each person was classified only as black or white. They began to curtail the privileges of Creoles of color.

See also

 Black is beautiful
 Colorism
 Good hair (phrase)
 High yellow
 Louisiana Creole people
 Mulatto
 Octoroon
 One-drop rule
 Passing (racial identity)
 Pencil test (South Africa)
 Quadroon
 School Daze

References

Further reading

External links
 The Paper Bag Test, an editorial by Bill Maxwell about blacks discriminating against blacks, St. Petersburg Times, August 31, 2003, discusses the history of the test.
 Skin-Deep Discrimination, ABC News, March 4, 2005

African-American cultural history
Discrimination based on skin color
History of racism in the United States